

Below is a list of trees that symbolise Venezuela and each state of the country:

National Tree
The National Tree of Venezuela is the Araguaney (Handroanthus chrysanthus).

State trees

See also
 National Symbols of Venezuela

External links
  Los Árboles Venezolanos

Venezuela
State trees
 
Trees